Temba is a male given name and may refer to;

 Temba Bavuma, a South African cricketer
 Temba, Gauteng, a town located in the Gauteng province of South Africa
 Paul Temba Nyathi, Zimbabwean politician
 Temba Tsheri, Sherpa from Nepal and youngest person to climb Mount Everest
 Brian Temba, (born Brian Themba Makiwane), a South African born performer, singer, songwriter and producer
Another name for the Tém people who live primarily in Togo
Temba is an open source model for sharing electrical power across Africa 

Masculine given names